New and Rediscovered Musical Instruments is a 1975 album by Max Eastley and David Toop. The album was the fourth release on Brian Eno's Obscure Records.

Toop was a music writer, broadcaster and a member of the London Musicians Collective with a particular interest in ethnic percussion and homemade wind instruments. Eastley was a kinetic sculptor who had created unusual new instruments such as the Centriphone and a Hydraphone. Toop and Eastley used these instruments to create the album.

The album was one of the first four releases on Eno's Obscure Records when they were simultaneously released in a limited edition of 2,000 copies each on December 5, 1975. This release had the catalogue number Obscure no.4. In common with most of the releases on Obscure it was produced by Brian Eno.

Track listing and personnel

Track B1
David Toop
The Cetaceans - Brian Eno, Chris Murno, Phil Jone

Track B2
David Toop - Guitar, bowed chordophone
Brian Eno - Bass
Paul Burwell - Bass drums, large lorry hub, 2-string fiddle
Frank Perry - Japanese resting bells
Hugh Davies - Harp (Grill)

Track B3
David Toop - Voice, flute, water

References

1975 albums
Albums produced by Brian Eno
Obscure Records albums